Tale of Pink Hare is a 2010 Kazakhstan low budget film directed by Farhat Sharipov.

Plot 
Yerlan is a young man from the provinces. He came to Almaty and later met a few students, who were the children of wealthy people. One of them agitated him to the point where he felt he had to adventure.

Cast
 Änwar Nurpeýisov as Yerlan
 Maksim Akbarov as Loko
 Qarlıģash Muhamedjanova as Djeka
 Farhat Abdraimov as Djaýbarxan
 Sanjar Madi as Jan
 Erbolat Toguzakov as Qaýrat
 Baxtiyar Qoja as Yerlan's mother
 Sayat Isembayev as Djonïk
 Murat Bïsembïn as Tïmur

Awards and nominations 
 Аward of the Union of Kazakhstan filmmakers to the best director (Farhat Sharipov)

References

External links
 

Kazakhstani drama films
Kazakh-language films
Films set in Kazakhstan